Astrophorina is a suborder of sea sponges in the class Demospongiae. Astrophorina was formerly named Astrophorida and classified as an order, but it is now recognised as a suborder of Tetractinellida

Bibliography
 
 Morrow & Cárdenas' (2015) revision of the higher taxa of the Demospongiae, Astrophorida sensu Lévi, 1973 (and sensu Hooper & Van Soest, 2002)

References

 
Taxa named by James Scott Bowerbank